The Battle of Rostov was an episode of the Fall Blau operation, which lasted five days and pitted the 56th Soviet Army, in retreat, against the 17th German Army and 1st Panzer Army which tried to surround it.

It was a definite success for the Germans who, thanks to a "commando" action of the Brandenburg Regiment, took the bridges over the Don, the Bataysk Bridge and the dike to the south of the city and prevented the flooding of swamp, which allowed them to continue their progress towards the Caucasus.

See also
 Battle of Rostov (1941) 
 Battle of Rostov (1943) – the Soviet Union recaptured the city.

References

Bibliography 
 
 
 

Conflicts in 1942
1942 in the Soviet Union
Battles involving the Soviet Union
Battles of World War II involving Germany
Battles and operations of the Soviet–German War
July 1942 events